Koroncó is a village in Győr-Moson-Sopron county, Hungary. Here was the battle of Koroncó on June 13, 1704 between the Kurucs and the army of Habsburg Empire.The local football team is called Koroncó KSSZE.

External links 
 Street map 

Populated places in Győr-Moson-Sopron County